Mesa is an unincorporated community in Adams County, Idaho, United States. Mesa has its own ZIP code, 83643. It is home to the Marymount Hermitage.

History
Mesa's population was 30 in 1960.

Orchards 
In the early 20th century, Mesa was home to the Mesa Orchards Company which was best known for its apple production. To combat the naturally dry area, a seven-mile-long wooden flume was constructed to transport water from the Middle Fork of the Weiser River. The final irrigation system was completed in 1911. In 1920, a tramway was built to convey fruit over three miles north to the railroad. The company changed ownership due to debt in 1936.

After 63 days of below zero temperatures in the winter of 1949, many of the fruit trees produced poorly and were eventually cleared for pasture. Today, the area is home to private residences, range, and pasture.

References

Unincorporated communities in Adams County, Idaho
Unincorporated communities in Idaho